Operación Triunfo is a Spanish reality television music competition to find new singing talent. The second series, also known as Operación Triunfo 2002, aired on La 1 from  7 October 2002 to 24 February 2003, presented by Carlos Lozano. 

Ainhoa Cantalapiedra was the winner of the series.

Headmaster, judges and presenter
Headmaster: Nina
Judges: Pilar Tabares, Pilar Zamora and Narcís Rebollo
Presenter: Carlos Lozano

Contestants

Galas

Results summary
Colour key

References

Operación Triunfo
La 1 (Spanish TV channel) original programming